220 Central Park South is a residential skyscraper in Midtown Manhattan in New York City, situated along Billionaires' Row on the south side of Central Park South between Broadway and Seventh Avenue. 220 Central Park South was designed by Robert A.M. Stern Architects and SLCE Architects, with interiors designed by Thierry Despont. It is composed of two sections: a 70-story,  tower on 58th Street, which is the 21st-tallest building in New York City, as well as an 18-story section on Central Park South, both of which contain a limestone facade. Most of the 118 apartments are duplex apartments, although some of the units have been combined to create larger units. The building has a porte-cochère, a wine cellar, private dining rooms, and various recreational facilities.

Vornado Realty Trust developed the building on the site of a rent-stabilized apartment complex constructed in 1954. While Vornado acquired the existing apartment building in 2005, a lawsuit from the existing building's tenants forced the demolition of the existing structure to be delayed to 2012. Additionally, Vornado had to settle a dispute with Extell, which owned a garage on the site and had expressed concern that Vornado's structure would block northward views of Extell's adjacent Central Park Tower. Robert A. M. Stern's designs were released in early 2014, and the plans were approved that March. Work on the base started in 2015 and most exterior work was done by the time the first residents moved into the building in 2018.

220 Central Park South contains some of the most expensive apartments in New York City, with a secretive purchasing process and many anonymous buyers. Two of the building's units have sold for over $100 million, including a $238 million unit purchased by billionaire hedge fund manager Kenneth C. Griffin in 2019, the most expensive home ever sold in the United States at the time.

Site 
220 Central Park South is in the Midtown Manhattan neighborhood of New York City, just east of Columbus Circle and south of Central Park. It has frontage on 58th Street to the south and Central Park South to the north, in the middle of a city block bounded by Seventh Avenue to the east and Broadway to the west. The building carries the alternate addresses of 225-231 West 58th Street. The site has frontage of  along 58th Street and  along Central Park South, with the Central Park South wing on the far eastern portion of the site.

Nearby buildings on the same block include Gainsborough Studios and 240 Central Park South to the west, as well as 200 Central Park South, the Helen Miller Gould Stable, and the firehouse of Engine Company 23 to the east. 220 Central Park South is across from the Central Park Tower, the American Fine Arts Society (also known as the Art Students League of New York building), the Saint Thomas Choir School, and the Osborne Apartments to the south. Other buildings along Billionaires' Row include 432 Park Avenue five blocks southeast, 111 West 57th Street and One57 one block southeast, and the adjacent Central Park Tower.

The previous building at the address 220 Central Park South was a 20-story structure with 125 apartments, constructed in 1954. It was developed by the J. H. Taylor Management Corporation and designed by Albert Mayer and Julian Whittlesey, all of whom had been involved with the earlier 240 Central Park South. The old 220 Central Park South was erected with a concrete frame and white-brick framework, and consisted of two "towers" connected by a promenade and garden. Real estate investor Sarah Korein ultimately came to own the old 220 Central Park South. The old building was demolished between 2012 and 2013.

Architecture

Robert A.M. Stern Architects designed the massing and exterior of 220 Central Park South, although SLCE Architects is listed in building documents as the architect of record. The building is one of several skyscrapers designed by Stern in Manhattan, which include 15 Central Park West, a few blocks to the north; 30 Park Place in the Financial District; and 520 Park Avenue, east of Central Park. Thierry Despont designed the interior spaces. Other firms involved in construction included structural engineer DeSimone Consulting Engineers and general contractor Lendlease.

Form 
The structure is composed of two sections: a 70-story tower on 58th Street and a shorter 18-story section on Central Park South. The massing of the building is influenced by the two zoning districts that the building occupies; different height restrictions were determined by the floor area ratios for each respective zoning district. One quarter of the site is on Central Park South, while the remaining three-quarters of the lot are on 58th Street.

Due to its slenderness, the building has been characterized as part of a new breed of New York City "pencil towers". The upper floors rise above the southern section of the site, both because of the light restriction and because the position of the floor slabs would enable all the residential units to face north toward Central Park. During construction, three alternatives for the massing and twenty-three alternatives for the floor slabs were studied.

The base of the building includes a smaller section on Central Park South, called "The Villas". This section is 18 stories tall, with a deep setback above the sixth floor and several smaller setbacks on upper floors. Portions of the Villas' facade contain metal balconies in front of the windows. Both sections of the building share a lobby and a three-story basement.

Facade 

220 Central Park South has a limestone facade similar to other buildings by Stern such as 15 Central Park West. 220 CPS's facade of Alabama "Silver Shadow" limestone has a "marbled" appearance (in contrast to 15 CPW's more uniform Indiana limestone). The usage of limestone was intended to blend with the more traditional facades of other buildings on Central Park's perimeter. According to Stern, 220 Central Park South's design was to "belong to the family of buildings that have framed Central Park for generations". Because of 220 Central Park South's height, it was infeasible to use hand-set or precast limestone sections, so the facade was instead designed as a curtain wall with window openings. The facade contains windows with detailed designs as well as a decorative rooftop crown. The Villa is also clad with the same Alabama limestone.

Structural features 

220 Central Park South's superstructure is concealed within its curtain walls. To maximize floor area, four large columns were installed along the northern side, a structural core on the southern side, and three smaller columns each on the western and eastern sides. This design was chosen over an alternative that would have placed several smaller columns on each side, but which was rejected because the developer did not want columns to be so closely spaced along the facade.

To maximize usable space on the upper floors, and thus maximize revenue from apartment sales, the mechanical equipment was placed at the base of the main tower on 58th Street. The roof of the main tower contains a slosh damper, which uses a huge tank of water to reduce vibrations. The damper weighs .

Interior

Apartments 
There are 118 apartments, most of which are duplex apartments. The apartments contain features such as oak flooring, custom millwork, and marble cladding of the kitchen islands and restrooms. Sources disagree on how many apartments are within the Villas section of the building. According to 6sqft, the Villas contains 13 condominium units, while according to The New York Times, the Villas has 10 condos.

Details of interior designs are scarce; The Wall Street Journal reported in late 2018 that the building's developer, Vornado, refused to publish renderings of apartment interiors. Some of the upper floors are designed so that they contain a single unit on each floor, or units spanning multiple floors. Some of the units have been combined to create larger penthouse or duplex apartments. For example, Vornado created a four-story "mega condo" by combining the  duplex on the 50th and 51st floors with three units on the 52nd and 53rd floors.

Amenities 
The two wings of 220 Central Park South abut a motor court with a porte-cochere, where vehicles could drop off and pick up residents and their guests. The building also has a wine cellar, an  saltwater swimming pool, private dining rooms, an athletic club, a juice bar, a library, a basketball court, a golf simulator and a children's play area. In 2019, Jean-Georges Vongerichten was selected to operate a residents-only, 54-seat restaurant at the second floor.

History

Land acquisition and planning 
In early 2005, Korein's estate placed the old building for sale. Because of the valuable air rights involved, one uninvolved broker estimated that the property would sell for as much as $160–175 million. At the time, the building had 47 tenants in rent-stabilized apartments, and 40% of the units were vacant. The Clarett Group was interested in purchasing the old 220 Central Park South, but did not have enough money to pay for the building up front. Warren Fink, the chief investment officer of the Clarett Group, contacted Vornado CEO Steven Roth and Vornado president Michael D. Fascitelli to join in the purchase.

The old building was purchased in August 2005 by Vornado for $136.6 million. Vornado intended to demolish the building and erect a 41-story glass tower, and served eviction notices to the building's eighty tenants in 2006. However, some of the rent-stabilized tenants refused to vacate, filing a lawsuit against Vornado. Although the New York Supreme Court initially ruled in favor of the tenants in 2008 under the grounds that a proper environmental review had not been conducted, this was overturned upon appeal in 2009. The developer ultimately settled with tenants the following year, paying between $1.3 million and $1.56 million each to those remaining in the building. Demolition of the existing structure began in 2012 and was completed in early 2013.

Meanwhile, Extell Development had leased the parking garage under part of the old building's site in 2006. Extell's CEO, Gary Barnett, stated that he leased the garage so that he would have enough parking for his own nearby developments. However, Extell repeatedly refused Vornado's attempts at a buyout or settlement. The dispute likely originated from the fact that Vornado's proposed building would block the views of Extell's proposed Central Park Tower development directly to the south, for which Extell had started acquiring land in 2005. The New York City Department of Buildings (DOB) fined Extell in May 2012, after Vornado claimed that Extell had violated the terms of the lease because residents of the empty rental building were not the main patrons of the garage. Vornado alleged that Extell had defaulted on the lease, having supposedly violated the lease terms, even though Extell's lease ran through 2018. Extell then sued Vornado that August, claiming that Vornado had intentionally created the violation by first emptying the building of tenants. A court enjoined the eviction in July 2013, permitting Extell to continue holding the garage.

In October 2013, the two companies reached a settlement in which Vornado would give Extell $194 million for the garage and some air rights. As part of the deal, 220 Central Park South would be shifted slightly westward and Central Park Tower would be cantilevered slightly eastward, giving the latter a direct view of Central Park. Without Central Park Tower's cantilever, 220 Central Park South would have blocked the first  of Central Park Tower.

Construction and financing 
In early 2014, the Bank of China gave Vornado a $600 million loan for the building's construction. Robert A. M. Stern was hired to create updated designs for the building, which were approved by the New York City Department of Buildings. in March 2014. The plans called for 83 apartments to be built inside a new 69-story,  tower at the site, and an additional 10 apartments in an adjoining 10-story "Villa". Site excavation was underway by May 2014. Construction of the foundations involved manual hammering and controlled blasts to reduce damage to several nearby buildings, including some New York City designated landmarks.

As late as April 2015, there was little information on the project and the building was still planned to have 93 total apartments. However, by May 2015, the building was proposed to contain 118 apartments. By that time, about a third of the units were already in contract, representing a combined $1.1 billion, even though public offerings had not yet started. That September, Vornado increased its Bank of China loan by $350 million and terminated a commitment for a $500 million mezzanine loan. Two months later, Vornado received an additional loan for the project, a $750 million unsecured term loan from multiple lenders.

The base of the tower was under construction by late 2015. Aboveground work reached 15 stories in February 2016 and 25 stories by that May. In November 2016, Justin Casquejo, a thrill-seeking teenage free solo climber and stunt performer, hung from the not-yet-completed tower. The construction process was generally secretive, leading real estate magazine The Real Deal to report in July 2018, "It has now been two years, eight months and 28 days since Vornado Realty Trust deigned to update Wall Street on sales at 220 Central Park South." According to Roth, the lack of updates was an intentional move for "competitive reasons". Brokers and lawyers uncovered floor plans and proposed prices by reviewing an offering plan filed with the Attorney General of New York, while reporters filed Freedom of Information Act requests to recover data from the offering plan.

Completion 
Facade work was finished by September 2018. By the end of that month, approximately 83% of the condominium units were under sales contracts, and closings were scheduled through 2020. The first residents started moving into the building in late 2018, and Vornado extended its $750 million unsecured term loan at that time, with the loan's maturity being pushed from 2020 to 2024.

By July 2019, exterior finishes were being placed on 220 Central Park South, and Vornado had repaid its full $950 million loan to the Bank of China. Later the same year, The Wall Street Journal wrote of the building's success as a "positive sign" for an otherwise unfavorable luxury real estate market. Vornado planned to use sales income from 220 Central Park South to finance capital expenditures of its other properties. By September 2020, the last exterior pieces were put on the building. In total, 220 Central Park South cost $1.5 billion to construct. Including hard construction costs, the building was estimated to cost .

Despite a general decrease in real estate sales in 2020 due to the COVID-19 pandemic in New York City, other units at 220 Central Park South were among the most expensive sold in New York City during that time. Only thirty condominiums remained to be sold by September 2020. Although Vornado lost hundreds of millions of dollars during 2020, because of a commercial real estate downturn caused by the pandemic, the company was able to lessen the loss with revenue from the sales of units at 220 Central Park South. The building accounted for $592 million in condominium sales in the third quarter of 2020, out of $1.85 billion in sales in the entire borough of Manhattan during that time.

Residents
Many of the buyers at 220 Central Park South chose to remain anonymous, purchasing units at the building through limited liability companies. According to a 2018 The Wall Street Journal article, neither Vornado nor the building's selling agent Corcoran Group were willing to divulge buyers' identities. In addition, The Real Deal reported in 2016 that the building did not have a public website, in contrast to other condominiums. Prospective buyers had to be represented by a real estate broker, who would request a questionnaire with personal questions about the buyer. If a prospective buyer's responses were deemed satisfactory, they would view a sales office, and Roth would personally interview the buyer, an unusual move for luxury condominiums. Richard Steinberg of the brokerage Douglas Elliman said, "Even if you had the money, it wasn’t guaranteed you could get a visit."

Notable confirmed buyers include executives such as Renata de Camargo Nascimento, co-owner of Brazilian construction company Camargo Correa; Albert Behler, CEO of Paramount Group; Byron Allen, CEO of Entertainment Studios; Eric Smidt, CEO of Harbor Freight Tools; finance executive Andrew Zaro; and real estate investor Richard Leibovitch. Other buyers have included billionaire hedge fund managers Daniel Och and Kenneth C. Griffin; real estate developer David Mandelbaum;  musician Sting and his wife, producer and actor Trudie Styler; and billionaire pharmaceutical businessman Ge Li.

Apartment sales 
The first sales contract closed on October 24, 2018, on a unit selling for $16.4 million. The first apartment in the Villas was sold the following year, in May 2019. The first listing for an apartment resale in the building occurred in January 2020, when Leibovitch listed his four-bedroom apartment for $36 million, a $10 million markup from the price at which he had purchased it. He subsequently lowered the price to $33 million, and the unit was sold at that price in September 2021.

220 Central Park South has had some of the most expensive residential real estate transactions in New York City's history. Griffin had agreed to purchase three floors in 2015 for $200 million, representing the city's costliest real estate purchase at the time. When Griffin finalized his purchase of a four-floor "mega condo" for $238 million in January 2019, it became the most expensive home ever sold in the United States, despite being valued at only $9.4 million. That December, an anonymous individual's $100 million purchase of a duplex atop the building became the third costliest residential purchase in New York City; the deal was finalized in July 2020. In June 2021, two full-floor units at floors 60 and 61 were sold for a combined $157.5 million to Joe Tsai, making it among the most expensive residential sales in New York City history; both units had increased significantly in price from 2020, when the units had traded for a combined $100 million. The popularity of 220 Central Park South, compared with other Billionaires' Row buildings, was attributed to the fact that it was the only Billionaires' Row development that was directly on Central Park. In January 2022, Joe Tsai bought Daniel Och's penthouse at floor 73 for $188 million, the second-most-expensive residential unit in the United States.

References

External links 

 Vornado website
 Robert A.M. Stern Architects website

2010s in Manhattan
2019 establishments in New York City
59th Street (Manhattan)
Midtown Manhattan
New Classical architecture
Pencil towers in New York City
Residential buildings completed in 2019
Residential condominiums in New York City
Residential skyscrapers in Manhattan
Robert A. M. Stern buildings